Live at Wembley Stadium is a live video by the Foo Fighters, released on August 22, 2008, in Ireland and August 25, 2008, in the UK on DVD.  It was also released in Australia on August 30, New Zealand on September 1, and Germany, Austria and Switzerland on September 5. It was released in the United States on November 18, 2008.

It was filmed during the band's two sold out shows at Wembley Stadium on Friday June 6 and Saturday June 7, 2008. The video features a combination of footage from both nights, including the second night's collaboration with special guests John Paul Jones (bass guitar) and Jimmy Page (guitar), formerly members of Led Zeppelin.

The video was also broadcast via satellite across the UK at Vue Cinemas on June 24, 2008. The video was shown in high definition with 5.1 surround sound, and was the same cut as the video release.

The release has been certified 3 times platinum by the Australian Recording Industry Association and gold by the Recording Industry Association of New Zealand.

The image on the artwork was shot by the aerial camera above the crowd on Friday 6 June.

Track listing
Some songs are taken from Friday's performance and some from Saturday's. This is identifiable in two ways. One is the underwear Grohl is wearing (Red on Friday, White on Saturday) which can be seen at points in the video, and secondly any shots containing rainfall are from Saturday, as it did not rain during Friday's performance.

"The Pretender" (Dave Grohl, Taylor Hawkins, Nate Mendel, Chris Shiflett)
"Times Like These" (Grohl, Hawkins, Mendel, Shiflett)
"No Way Back" (Grohl, Hawkins, Mendel, Shiflett)
"Cheer Up, Boys (Your Make Up Is Running)" (Grohl, Hawkins, Mendel, Shiflett)
"Learn to Fly" (Grohl, Hawkins, Mendel)
"Long Road to Ruin" (Grohl, Hawkins, Mendel, Shiflett)
"Breakout" (Grohl, Hawkins, Mendel)
"Stacked Actors"/"Hocus Pocus" (Grohl, Hawkins, Mendel)/(Jan Akkerman, Thijs van Leer)
"Skin and Bones" (Grohl)
"Marigold" (Grohl)
"My Hero" (Grohl, Mendel, Pat Smear)
"Cold Day in the Sun" (Hawkins)
"Everlong" (Grohl)
"Monkey Wrench" (Grohl, Mendel, Smear)
"All My Life" (Grohl, Hawkins, Mendel, Shiflett)
"Rock and Roll" (John Bonham, John Paul Jones, Jimmy Page, Robert Plant)
"Ramble On" (Page, Plant)
"Best of You" (Grohl, Hawkins, Mendel, Shiflett)

Notes
 Tracks 8, 9, 13 and 14 recorded on Friday, June 6, 2008
 Tracks 1-7, 10-12 and 15-18 recorded on Saturday, June 7, 2008
 Multiple other songs were played across both nights but were omitted from the film;
 "But, Honestly", "DOA", and "Generator" were performed on June 6.
 "Let It Die" was performed on June 7.
 "This Is a Call" and "Big Me" were performed on both nights.
 "Rock And Roll" and "Ramble On" were only performed the second night.

Charts

Personnel

Band members
Dave Grohl – lead vocals, backing vocals, rhythm and lead guitar, drums on "Rock and Roll"
Nate Mendel – bass guitar
Taylor Hawkins – drums, backing vocals, lead vocals on "Cold Day in the Sun" and "Rock and Roll"
Chris Shiflett – lead and rhythm guitar, backing vocals

Touring Members
Pat Smear – guitar
Rami Jaffee – organ, keyboards, accordion
Jessy Greene – cello, violin, backing vocals
Drew Hester – percussion, vibraphone

Special guests
John Paul Jones – bass guitar on "Rock and Roll" and "Ramble On"
Jimmy Page – guitar on "Rock and Roll" and "Ramble On"

References

Foo Fighters video albums
Live albums recorded at Wembley Stadium
Live video albums
2008 live albums
2008 video albums
RCA Records live albums
RCA Records video albums
Foo Fighters live albums